Gustavo Cañete (born April 4, 1977 in Salamanca, Spain) is a Paraguayan footballer currently playing for Espoli of the Serie A of Ecuador.

Teams
  Cerro Porteño 1997-1998
  América 1999
  Atlante 1999-2000
  Guaraní 2000-2001
  Veracruz 2002
  12 de Octubre 2003
  Tigrillos 2003-2004
  San Luis Potosí 2004-2005
  3 de Febrero 2005-2006
  Millonarios 2007
  Deportivo Pereira 2007
  Deportivo Azogues 2008
  Espoli 2009–2011

External links

 
 

1977 births
Living people
Paraguayan footballers
Paraguay under-20 international footballers
Paraguayan expatriate footballers
12 de Octubre Football Club players
Cerro Porteño players
Club Guaraní players
Club América footballers
Atlante F.C. footballers
C.D. Veracruz footballers
San Luis F.C. players
C.D. ESPOLI footballers
Club Atlético 3 de Febrero players
Millonarios F.C. players
Deportivo Pereira footballers
Liga MX players
Categoría Primera A players
Expatriate footballers in Mexico
Expatriate footballers in Ecuador
Expatriate footballers in Colombia
Association footballers not categorized by position